Museum of the City of Skopje is a cultural institution located in Skopje, North Macedonia. Founded in 1949, it is located in a former railway station that was partly destroyed in the 1963 earthquake. The museum is home to permanent еxhibitions representing the history of Skopje, from the first recorded settlements around 3000 BC to present.

External links
Official Website

Buildings and structures in Skopje
Museums established in 1949
Museums in North Macedonia
City museums
1949 establishments in Yugoslavia